David Roy Akers (born December 9, 1974) is an American former football placekicker who played in the National Football League (NFL) for 16 seasons, primarily with the Philadelphia Eagles. He began his career in 1998 with the Washington Redskins after not making the main roster of the Atlanta Falcons and Carolina Panthers. The following year, he signed with the Eagles, where he spent 12 seasons. Akers was also a member of the San Francisco 49ers and Detroit Lions before retiring in 2013.

During his career, Akers was named to six Pro Bowls and twice received first-team All-Pro honors. He also tied the then-NFL record for the longest successful field goal when he converted a 63-yard field goal, which is the third-longest in league history. Akers is an inductee of the Eagles Hall of Fame and a member of the Eagles' 75th Anniversary Team, along with being named to the second-team of the NFL 2000s All-Decade Team.

Early years
Akers attended Tates Creek High School in Lexington, Kentucky.

College career
Akers attended college at the University of Louisville and played for the Louisville Cardinals football team. During his four-year college career, Akers kicked a school-record 36 field goals (with a long of 51 yards against Texas A&M University), and ranks second on Louisville's all-time scoring list, with 219 points.

Professional career

Atlanta Falcons and Carolina Panthers
Between 1997 and 1998, as an undrafted free agent, Akers spent time trying to make the team with the Atlanta Falcons and Carolina Panthers.

Washington Redskins
Akers was signed by the Washington Redskins in 1998 and played in one game for them, making two extra points but missing two field goal attempts of 48+ yards each. He was waived by the Redskins during the 1999 season.

Philadelphia Eagles
After Washington cut Akers, the Philadelphia Eagles claimed him off waivers and allocated him to NFL Europe.  A solid season with the Berlin Thunder helped him earn the kicking job for the Eagles in 2000.
Akers proved to be one of the biggest special teams surprises in all of the NFL that season.  He made 29 out of 33 field goals (an 87.9% success rate), and had a team-record 121 points. Akers earned the NFC Special Teams Player of the Month award in November 2000.  He made the Pro Bowl for the first time in 2001 as he went 26-for-31, making a team-record seventeen consecutive field goals during the season.

Akers' best statistical season was 2002 when he connected on 30 of 34 field goals (88.2%), scored a team-record 133 points, and made another Pro Bowl.  He got fewer chances in 2003, but still made 24 of 29 field goals.  He made the third-longest field goal in Eagles' history on September 14, 2003, a 57-yarder against the New England Patriots at the new Lincoln Financial Field. (The only longer field goals in Eagles' history have been Jake Elliott's 61-yard field goal in 2017 and Tony Franklin's 59-yard field goal in 1979.)  In 2004, Akers continued his consistent kicking with an 84.4% field goal percentage, and he made his third Pro Bowl.

Injuries got to Akers in 2005 when he tore the hamstring in his non-kicking leg during the opening kickoff against the Oakland Raiders on September 25, 2005. Akers left the game, but returned in the second half with a heavily taped leg to make two extra points and then kick the game-winning 28-yard field goal before collapsing in pain as his teammates mobbed him. He missed the next four games and finished the season 16 for 22.

In 2006, Akers was injury-free, but made only 18 of 23 attempts (78.3%), his second-worst season statistically.

On December 16, 2007, in a 10–6 win over the Dallas Cowboys, Akers set the Philadelphia Eagles franchise record for most points and on Thanksgiving in 2008, Akers passed 1,000 career points during a 48–20 win over the Arizona Cardinals.

On December 7, 2008, Akers kicked a 51-yard field goal at Giants Stadium, his longest of the season. In the same game he had two field goals blocked, one of which was returned for a touchdown. At the end of the 2008 regular season, Akers again set the team single-season scoring record with an NFC-best 144 points. He connected on 33 of 40 field goals (82.5 pct), his best percentage since 2004.

On January 11, 2009, Akers kicked three field goals in three attempts during a divisional playoff win over the New York Giants. The second of these set an NFL record for consecutive field goals without a miss during the postseason, previously held by one-time Eagle Gary Anderson. Akers eventually ran his streak to a record 19 consecutive postseason field goal conversions; it was snapped the very next week against the Arizona Cardinals. Akers had a total of thirty-five postseason field goal conversions during his career.

Akers was selected to the 2010 Pro Bowl, his fourth. He was also named to the NFL All-Decade Team for the 2000s. After the 2010 season, he was selected to his fifth career Pro Bowl.

San Francisco 49ers
Akers was signed by the San Francisco 49ers to a $9 million, three-year contract on July 29, 2011.  He kicked a 59-yard field goal just before halftime in a preseason game against the New Orleans Saints on August 12, 2011.  On September 18, 2011, he kicked a 55-yard field goal against the Dallas Cowboys, setting a record for the longest field goal made at Candlestick Park.

Akers broke the 49ers' record for most points scored in a season in a 20–3 win over the Pittsburgh Steelers in a Monday Night Football matchup on December 19, 2011. The record was formerly held by the 49ers' Hall of Fame wide receiver, Jerry Rice. In that same game against the Seahawks, Akers broke the all-time record for field goals in a season, surpassing Neil Rackers' 40 in 2005.

On January 1, 2012, Akers broke the NFL record for most points by a kicker in a single season against the St. Louis Rams; he finished with 166 points. In this game, he also extended his NFL record for most field goals made in a single season, finishing with 44, and threw for a touchdown on a fake field goal. Akers made his sixth Pro Bowl at the end of the season.

On September 9, 2012, Akers tied the NFL record for the longest field goal by kicking a 63-yard field goal off the crossbar against the Green Bay Packers at Lambeau Field, tying the overall, and now non-altitude-assisted record.  It was the first non-altitude-assisted kick of that length since 1970.  The non-altitude assisted record was originally set by Tom Dempsey in 1970 and Graham Gano tied it in 2018.  The overall record was shared with Jason Elam and Sebastian Janikowski (and later beaten by Justin Tucker of the Ravens in 2021 at Detroit) until Broncos kicker Matt Prater broke the record with a 64-yard field goal on December 8, 2013, but those took place in Denver, Colorado, where altitude assistance on field goal kicks, similar to sprint running and throwing events, is known.

The long field goals by Elam, Janikowski, and Prater were all made in Denver, where the ball has the ability to travel slightly farther in thinner air.  Elam kicked his 63-yard field goal at Mile High Stadium, while the 63-yarder by Janikowski and the 64-yarder by Prater were at Sports Authority Field at Mile High. In track and field, the IAAF denotes any records set 1,000 metres (about 3,937 feet) or more above sea level as altitude-assisted records, and the Dempsey (Tulane Stadium) and Akers (Lambeau Field) records were set below the 1,000m threshold.

The 49ers advanced to Super Bowl XLVII following the 2012 season, marking Akers' second appearance in the game. In the game, Akers went 3 for 3 in field goal attempts, but San Francisco narrowly lost to the Baltimore Ravens by a 34–31 score.

On March 6, 2013, Akers was released after two seasons with the 49ers.

Detroit Lions
On April 6, 2013, Akers signed with the Detroit Lions, three days after the retirement of 21-season Lions kicker Jason Hanson.

NFL records
Points in a single decade (2000–2009): 1,169
Points in Pro Bowl History: 57
Most points in a season, no touchdowns (2011): 166
Most games 4+ field goals in a season (2011): 6
Most games 10+ points in a season (2011): 10 - tied with four others
Field Goals in an NFL Season: 44
Field Goals attempted in an NFL Season: 52
Longest Field Goal in Pro Bowl History: 53 yards, 2005 (Eagles).

NFL career statistics

Personal life
Akers and his wife, Erika, reside in Franklin, Tennessee, with their sons Luke and Sawyer and daughter Halley. He has maintained a summer residence in Ocean City, New Jersey. Luke is a punter for the Northwestern Wildcats.

Akers is a Christian.

In 2001, the Akers family formed the David Akers Kicks for Kids Foundation, which has established programs with the Children's Hospital of Philadelphia to benefit sick children and their families. He has also trained in martial arts jiu-jitsu and Shaolin Kempo.

On April 27, 2018, Akers was selected to announce an Eagles second-round draft pick during the 2018 NFL Draft, which took place at the Cowboys' AT&T Stadium. Akers made a dramatic speech complete with trash talk directed at Cowboys fans, reminiscent to what Drew Pearson did the previous year in Philadelphia. Akers announced Dallas Goedert as the 49th overall pick.

References

External links
Stats at Pro-Football-Reference
Kicking Videos by David Akers
San Francisco 49ers bio

1974 births
Living people
American football placekickers
Atlanta Falcons players
Berlin Thunder players
Carolina Panthers players
Detroit Lions players
Louisville Cardinals football players
National Conference Pro Bowl players
People from Medford, New Jersey
People from Ocean City, New Jersey
Philadelphia Eagles players
Players of American football from Lexington, Kentucky
San Francisco 49ers players
Tates Creek High School alumni
Washington Redskins players
American Christians
American wushu practitioners
American jujutsuka